George Pero (April 16, 1916 – March 23, 1988) was an American tennis player in the 1930s, 1940s and 1950s. He was born in Miami, Florida.

Pero played on the University of Miami tennis team that went unbeaten for three years between 1938 and 1940. While Pero was on the team, it lost to only two other colleges (Stanford and the University of California), and Pero himself didn't lose a single match during his sophomore and junior years at Miami.

Pero enlisted in the Army Air Corp in the spring of 1942. After World War II, he continued his tennis career, winning the Southern Championships and several state titles including Kentucky, Louisiana and Alabama.

During his career, he had wins over future International Tennis Hall of Fame enshrinees Frank Parker, Sidney Wood and Don McNeill, and former NCAA singles champion Gardner Larned.

At the tournament now known as the Cincinnati Masters, Pero reached the singles final in 1947 before falling to future International Tennis Hall of Fame enshrinee Bill Talbert. Pero also reached doubles finals in Cincinnati before the War and after it. He teamed with Bill Hardie to reach the doubles final in 1937 (they lost to John McDiarmid & Eugene McCauliff) and with Richard Hart to reach the doubles final in 1947 (they lost to Talbert & Morey Lewis).

Pero has been inducted into the Miami City Sports Hall of Fame.

References
Mention of the George Pero Memorial Classic

1916 births
1988 deaths
American male tennis players
Miami Hurricanes men's tennis players
Tennis players from Miami